Baltimore and Ohio Railroad Station (or variants) can refer to the following railway stations in the United States:

Baltimore and Ohio Railroad Station (Oakland) in Oakland, Maryland
Baltimore and Ohio Railroad Station (Philadelphia), also known as the 24th Street Station, in Philadelphia, Pennsylvania
Mount Royal Station in Baltimore, Maryland
Water Street Station in Wilmington, Delaware
Philippi B & O Railroad Station in Philippi, West Virginia
Silver Spring Baltimore and Ohio Railroad Station in Silver Spring, Maryland
Wheeling Baltimore and Ohio Railroad Passenger Station in Wheeling, West Virginia
Barnesville Baltimore and Ohio Railroad Depot in Barnesville, Ohio
Athens B & O Train Depot in Athens, Ohio
Baltimore and Ohio Station (Pittsburgh) in Pittsburgh, Pennsylvania
Pittsburgh & Lake Erie Railroad Station in Pittsburgh, Pennsylvania—also used as the city's B&O station
Nappanee station in Nappanee, Indiana
Gary station in Gary, Indiana
Miller station in Miller, Gary, Indiana
Grand Central Station (Chicago) in Chicago, Illinois
Springfield station (Illinois) in Springfield, Illinois
Connersville station in Connersville, Indiana

See also
Stations along Baltimore and Ohio Railroad lines
Baltimore and Ohio Railroad